Light bulbs for automobiles are made in several standardized series. Bulbs used for headlamps, turn signals and brake lamps may be required to comply with international and national regulations governing the types of lamps used. Other  automotive lighting applications such as auxiliary lamps or interior lighting may not be regulated, but common types are used by many automotive manufacturers.

International
The World Forum for Harmonization of Vehicle Regulations (ECE Regulations) develops and maintains international-consensus UN Regulations on light sources acceptable for use in lamps on vehicles and trailers type-approved for use in countries that recognise the UN Regulations. These include Regulation 37, which contains specifications for filament lamps, and Regulation 99 and its addenda
which covers light sources for high-intensity discharge headlamps. Some UN-approved bulb types are also permitted by some other regulations, such as those of the United States or of Japan, though Japan has begun supplanting the former Japanese national regulations with the international UN regulations.

Filament lamps
UN Regulation 37 covers motor vehicle filament lamps. These are categorized in three groups: those without general restriction that can be used in any application, those acceptable only for signalling lights (not for road illumination lamps), and those no longer allowable as light sources for new type approvals but still permitted for production as replacement parts.

Group 1

Group 2

Group 3

Gas discharge lamps 
UN Regulation 99 covers gas discharge light sources for use in vehicle headlamps. All light sources acceptable under Regulation 99 are also acceptable under US regulations.

Germany 
There is a German national regulation for vehicle bulbs, now superseded by international ECE regulations. Bulbs according to the old German regulation are still manufactured. The German regulation is contained in §22a, Subsection 1, No. 18 of the Straßenverkehrs-Zulassungs-Ordnung (StVZO, Road Traffic Approval Regulation). Per the Fahrzeugteileverordnung (FzTV, Vehicle Parts Regulation), such light bulbs must bear an approval mark consisting of a sine wave and the letter 'K'. The technical requirements themselves are established by standards produced by DIN.

United States and Canada
In the United States, entry 49 CFR 564 in the Code of Federal Regulations requires manufacturers of headlight bulbs, officially known as "replaceable light sources", to furnish the National Highway Traffic Safety Administration (NHTSA) with product specifications at least 60 days prior to first use. The specifications supplied by the manufacturer, on approval by NHTSA, are entered in Federal docket NHTSA-1998-3397. From then on, any light source made and certified by any manufacturer as conforming to the specifications is legal for use in headlamps certified as conforming to Federal Motor Vehicle Safety Standard 108. Light sources for vehicle lamps other than headlamps are not Federally regulated.

In Canada, vehicle headlamps may use light sources (bulbs) conforming to either the US or the international ECE regulations.

Other countries

See also 
 List of lamp caps and holders
 Sealed beam

References 

Auto parts
Automotive lamps